Sredny Kachmash (Urta Qasmaş) is a rural locality (a village) in Nizhnekachmashevsky Selsoviet, Kaltasinsky District, Bashkortostan, Russia. The population was 27 as of 2010. There is 1 street.

Geography 
Sredny Kachmash is located 15 km northwest of Kaltasy (the district's administrative centre) by road. Ilchibay is the nearest rural locality.

References 

Rural localities in Kaltasinsky District